SS Suez Maru was a Japanese passenger-cargo ship, used as a hell ship, which was torpedoed by submarine  on 29 November 1943, carrying 548 Allied prisoners of war (POWs) of which many drowned and the rest, some 250 men, were shot by the Japanese.

Service history
Suez Maru sailed on 25 November 1943 with 547 POWs (414 British and 133 Dutch) from Ambon bound for Surabaya. The POWs were all sick men from the work-camps on the Moluccas and Ambon. About twenty men were on stretchers. There were also around two hundred sick and wounded Japanese soldiers on board.

About half of the POWs drowned in the aft hold of the ship, but about 250 - 280 escaped from the holds and jumped into the water. Nearly four hours later the escort ship, minesweeper No.12 returned from dropping depth charges near Bonefish, the minesweeper only picked up Japanese survivors, pushing POWs back into the water if they tried to climb aboard.
Then Captain Kawano Osumu, master of W-12, discussed with the POW transport commander Lt. Masaji Koshio (aka Masaji Iketani) what should be done with the surviving POWs. Koshio/Iketani informed him that Major General Sanso Anami had told him that in the event of the ship being torpedoed that the POWs should be shot. Captain Kawano quickly agreed ordering gunnery officer Yatsuka to arrange twenty soldiers with rifles on deck and two machine-guns on the lower bridge, whilst other crew pointed out survivors amongst the wreckage. The gunnery crew then machine-gunned all surviving POWs in the water. All were killed. There were also some three Japanese casualties which went down with Suez Maru. 
The minesweeper No.12 report lodged at Batavia on 3 December 1943 stated that the POWs were kept in the holds and the hatches locked and stated that they had all drowned on the sinking, and made no mention of the war crime. This war crime was extensively investigated in 1949, following its reporting by one of the c.200 wounded Japanese soldiers aboard the Suez Maru that day, a Yoshio Kashiki. Dozens of first hand accounts and sworn statements were taken from twenty-two individuals; suspects and eye witnesses, Kawano and Iketani being arrested. 
A memorial to the 414 British POWs aboard Suez Maru who were murdered by the Japanese was dedicated on 29 November 2013 at the National Memorial Arboretum, Alrewas, Staffordshire.

References
(incorrect source) this was not written by US navy. They have never investigated it. This text appears in unwritten letters to Spring Street.

Further reading
Jones, Allan (2002). The Suez Maru atrocity : justice denied! : the story of Lewis Jones, a victim of a WW2 Japanese hell-ship. Hornchurch: A.D. Jones. ISBN 978-0954272500.

Frith, Jacquelyn (2020) Unwritten Letters To Spring Street. the story of Jack Frith, a victim of the WW2 Japanese hell-ship, Suez Maru. Clink Street : ISBN 978-1913568276.

External links

 Saint Helens rolls of honour

 [www.Facebook.co.uk/suezmaru Suez Maru Research and Campaign Group]

1919 ships
Ships sunk by American submarines
Maritime incidents in November 1943
Ships built by Uraga Dock Company
World War II shipwrecks in the Pacific Ocean
Japanese hell ships